Fausto Eliseo Coppini (born in 1870 in Milan, Italy – Buenos Aires, Argentina, 1945) was an Italian-Argentine painter.

Biography
Coppini was born in Milan and studied art at the Brera Academy. In 1888, he moved to South America traveling through Chile and Peru. After a brief sojourn in Italy, he permanently settled in Buenos Aires.

In 1888–1889, he won a silver medal at the International Exhibition for the 100th Anniversary of Argentina. Among his pupils were Ángel Vena, Rodolfo Franco, Gastón Jarry, and Atilio Malinverno.

References

1870 births
1945 deaths
Artists from Milan
19th-century Argentine painters
19th-century Argentine male artists
Argentine male painters
Italian emigrants to Argentina
20th-century Argentine painters
Brera Academy alumni
20th-century Argentine male artists